TV4 (TV fyra) is a Swedish free-to-air television network owned by TV4 AB, a subsidiary of the TV4 Media AB. It started broadcasting by satellite in 1990 and, since 1992, on terrestrial television. In 1994, TV4 became the largest channel and remained so for a number of years. The two channels of Sveriges Television (SVT) lost more and more viewers for a couple of years. After making schedule changes in 2001, SVT1 had practically the same numbers of viewers as TV4. From 2004 to 2019, the TV4 Group was a fully active member of the European Broadcasting Union.

History
TV4 was launched on 15 September 1990. The channel invested in an extensive news organisation and Swedish drama series. The premiere suffered from technical faults and the drama series weren't popular with critics.

In 1991, two of the channel's oldest entertainment programmes premiered: the Swedish version of Jeopardy! and the Saturday night bingo show Bingolotto. Bingolotto in particular became highly popular. This year also saw TV4 being awarded a license to broadcast terrestrially.

Terrestrial broadcasts started on 2 March 1992. During that year, Nyhetsmorgon started and marked the introduction of weekday breakfast television in Sweden.

During the 1990s, TV4 would broadcast several popular Friday night entertainment shows such as Fångarna på fortet (Swedish version of Fort Boyard), Kär och galen, Tur i kärlek, På rymmen, Sikta mot stjärnorna  (Soundmix Show), Stadskampen, (Intervilles) and Småstjärnorna (Mini Playback Show).

They have also broadcast several home-grown sitcoms such as Rena Rama Rolf and En fyra för tre as well as the soap opera Tre kronor.

In the early 1990s, the TV4 Group decided to move their 7pm evening news to 7:30pm in order to compete with the most popular news programme, Rapport, which, at that time, was broadcast on SVT2. This failed and the news was subsequently moved to 6:30pm. In 2004, the evening news was moved to 7pm, and the status quo reinstated.

In 2004, TV4 began transitioning to become a digital-only service, starting by shutting down its analogue satellite signal on March 31 2004. On 19 September 2005, TV4 began shutting down analogue terrestrial transmissions, starting at the island of Gotland. The analogue shutoff was completed by October 2007.

Since 2004, TV4 has been broadcasting a Swedish version of the internationally popular Pop Idol format.

In July 2018 it was announced that Bonnier Broadcasting would be acquired by Telia Company for 9.2 billion SEK, thus making Telia the new owner of TV4. The acquisition was completed on 2 December 2019.

Programming
TV4 offers a mix of news, sports, drama series, soaps, entertainment, current affairs programmes, sitcoms, feature films, documentaries and phone-in shows. News is an important part of TV4. It broadcasts the news program TV4Nyheterna at 7pm and 10pm and Nyhetsmorgon (News Morning) in the mornings. On weekend mornings there is children's programming in Swedish before Nyhetsmorgon starts. After 11pm until Nyhetsmorgon, it shows reruns and some Swedish and English television series.

After the Nyhetsmorgon ends on weekdays the Efter tio (After ten) starts followed by English spoken TV series up until the news at 7pm. In the daytime on weekends there are often reruns and sports programs. Then main Swedish and English TV programs are broadcast up to the 10pm news. Friday nights have included family entertainment at 8pm since the early 1990s. Bingolotto occupied Saturday evenings from 1991 to 2004. TV4 then moved Bingolotto to Sundays and started broadcasting feature films instead. With the start of Deal or No Deal in 2006, family entertainment returned to Saturday nights. Later, there are other entertainment shows on Saturday evenings. On Sunday evenings, Swedish-produced television programs are shown until 9pm when they show a movie on Saturday nights. They also show a movie after the entertainment show.

After about 11pm until Nyhetsmorgon starts they show reruns and some Swedish and English television series. The foreign programs are mainly from the UK and USA. All foreign programmes, as well as segments of local programmes with foreign language content (e.g. news interviews), are subtitled into Swedish. TV4 also offers investigative journalism programmes, most notably Kalla fakta ("Cold Facts").

Regional stations
As a part of its public service obligations, TV4 owns and operates a number of regional and local opt-out stations. When the local stations were set up, they were owned by both local investors and the TV4 Group themselves. Since the start of TV4 Uppland in 1996, the number of stations has been sixteen. Although some stations have closed and others have been set up, the total number of stations has stayed unchanged.

The TV4 Group brought out many of the local stations and became the sole owner of fifteen stations in 2001. The only independent station, TV4 Fyrstad, went bankrupt in 2003 and was replaced by TV4 Väst, owned and operated by the TV4 Group. The TV4 Group later merged the stations into five regional companies and in 2004, a single company: TV4 Sverige AB.

, these are the local TV4 stations:

TV4 Värmland (Värmland)
TV4 Väst ("West")
TV4 Göteborg (Gothenburg)
TV4 Halland (Halland)
TV4 Öresund (The Sound)
TV4 Sydost ("Southeast")
TV4 Jönköping (Jönköping)
TV4 Skaraborg (Skaraborg County)
TV4 Öst ("East")
TV4 Stockholm (Stockholm)
TV4 Mälardalen (Mälaren Valley)
TV4 Uppland (Uppland)
TV4 Gävle Dalarna (Gävle and Dalarna)
TV4 Mitt ("Central")
TV4 Västerbotten (West Bothnia)
TV4 Norrbotten (North Bothnia)

After the closedown of the analogue transmitters and the termination of TV4's public service obligations, the pattern of the local stations is due to a major overhaul which will see the number of local stations increase.

TV4 Play and C More
TV4 Play is the brand used for the video on demand service offered by the TV4 Group, more specifically to the streaming services offered on the TV4 Play website, www.tv4play.se. Content on TV4 Play usually comes with advertisements, but users can watch the same content without advertisements on the subscription-based C More platform, which also provides a livestream of TV4 and its sister channels.

Jurisdiction
As TV4 is broadcast from Sweden, it has to follow much tighter advertising rules than its main competitors, Nordic Entertainment Group (TV3) and Discovery Communications Nordic (Kanal 5). Initially this meant that the TV4 Group was not allowed to include advertising breaks, meaning that the advertising had to be put in between the programmes.

Nonetheless, the TV4 Group felt the urge to include advertising breaks. Therefore, it made several Inför programmes. The Inför programmes were short versions of TV4 programmes that were scheduled in the middle of programmes. For example, Fångarna på fortet would be divided into two parts and in between these, Inför Bingolotto would be shown. This allowed TV4 to broadcast advertising in the gaps between Inför Bingolotto and the two halves of Fångarna på fortet.

The Broadcasting Commission repeatedly ruled that the Inför programmes couldn't be considered as real programmes. In 2000 they were replaced by a programme called Dagens namn, in which the current name day was mentioned. This was later on replaced by Om en bok in which famous people presented a book they enjoyed.

This ended in April 2002 when a new Radio and TV Law came into force, allowing the TV4 Group to interrupt its programmes for advertising, but not to the same extent as TV3 and Kanal 5.

The Radio and TV Law also restricted the amount of advertising that can be shown to ten percent of the programming. Since TV4 was the only commercial channel allowed to broadcast terrestrially, it had to pay a special fee to the government, consisting of a fixed fee and a variable element based on the amount of advertising that the TV4 Group sells. The TV4 Group worked to have this fee removed, especially with the launch of digital terrestrial television.

The centre-right Reinfeldt Cabinet intended to relax the advertising rules. TV4 would then broadcast up to twelve minutes of advertising (as opposed to the previous ten minutes in prime time and eight minutes during other time). The amount of advertising overall would also raise from ten percent to fifteen percent, giving TV4 the same rules as the UK-based broadcasters.

Personalities

 Adam Alsing
 Agneta Sjödin
 Bengt Magnusson
 David Hellenius
 Jessica Almenäs
 Linda Isacsson
 Martin Timell
 Peter Eng
 Peter Jihde
 Yvonne Ryding

References

External links

 

Television channels in Sweden
Television channels and stations established in 1990
TV4 AB
European Broadcasting Union members
1990 establishments in Sweden